Walburn is a hamlet and civil parish in the Richmondshire district of North Yorkshire, England. The population of the parish was estimated at 10 in 2016.

The army training camp of Wathgill is in the parish.

History 
The toponym is derived from the Old English wala "Britons or Welshmen" and burna "stream", indicating the presence of Britons in the area when the English arrived.

Walburn was historically a township in the parish of Downholme in the wapentake of Hang West in the North Riding of Yorkshire.  From 1286 Walburn was held of the manor of Thornton Steward, whose lords were mesne tenants of the honour of Richmond.

Walburn became a separate civil parish in 1866.  In 1974 it was transferred to the new county of North Yorkshire.

Walburn Hall 
Walburn Hall is a fortified house probably dating from the 12th century but much altered in the 15th and 16th centuries.  It is a Grade I listed building, now used as a farmhouse.

References

External links

Villages in North Yorkshire
Civil parishes in North Yorkshire
Richmondshire